Jade Bird is the self-titled debut studio album of British singer-songwriter Jade Bird. It was released on 19 April 2019 through Glassnote Records. The album includes her debut single "Lottery", which came after her debut extended play Something American, released from the preceding year, and also her breakout single "Uh Huh". The album was supported by a European and North American tour, which includes opening for The Lumineers and Hozier.

Critical reception 

The album received a Metacritic score of 75 based on 13 reviews, indicating generally favourable reviews.

Track listing
All tracks written by Jade Bird; all tracks produced by Simone Felice and David Baron, except for "Uh Huh", which was produced alongside Alex "Lefti" Suarez.

Charts

References

2019 debut albums
Jade Bird albums
Glassnote Records albums